Fábio Miguel Silva Oliveira (born 1 September 1993) is a Portuguese footballer who plays for Avanca as a goalkeeper.

Football career
On 11 May 2014, Oliveira made his professional debut with Oliveirense in a 2013–14 Segunda Liga match against Portimonense.

References

External links

Stats and profile at LPFP 

1993 births
Living people
Portuguese footballers
Association football goalkeepers
Liga Portugal 2 players
U.D. Oliveirense players